St. Luke's Church is a former Church of Ireland parish church in Dublin, Ireland.  It is located on The Coombe, not far from St. Patrick's Cathedral.

The building

History as a church
In 1708, an act of parliament was passed, dividing the parish of St. Nicholas Without and giving part of it the denomination of St. Luke's. A glebe house was erected on The Coombe for the vicar, who was nominated by the Chapter of St. Patrick's Cathedral, and the church of St. Luke erected not far from the Glebe, probably by Thomas Burgh, Surveyor General.

It has been said that the church was built mainly for the benefit of the conformist French Huguenot weavers who lived in the neighbourhood. However, very few, if any, French names appeared in the parish registers from this time - the Huguenots had their own place of worship in a chapel in nearby St. Patrick's Cathedral. However, there was a huge influx of weavers and others associated with the silk and poplin industries and cotton and wool manufacture.

Later history
The church was closed in 1975. It was burned by an arsonist in 1986. It is in the ownership of Dublin City Council and is listed for conservation by the Council.

The church was reopened in 2017 after a complete restoration, in which a new two floor office facility was installed within the church walls. The grounds were converted into public space, and the graves were moved by Dublin City Council.

The cemetery
Behind the church was a small cemetery. Among those interred there was Mr. Justice Hellen, second Judge of the Court of Common Pleas in Ireland, who died in 1793. Also buried here were the family of famous publisher Alexander Thom. The relief road leading to Cork St., built 1980-2000, cut through the old cemetery.

The parish

The parish lay at the southern end of the Liberty of Thomas Court and Donore, which in turn was located to the west of the medieval city of Dublin. The northern boundary was the Coombe.

Most of the parish population in the late 17th and 18th centuries were weavers in the Dublin Liberties. Wool manufacturing more or less died out after the Wool Act of 1699, which prevented the export of Irish wool, but silk, cotton and poplin industries continued to employ large numbers and generate wealth until the end of the 18th century. In 1766, in order to check the growth of Catholics, the British government ordered a religious census to be carried out by the Protestant clergy, which showed the parish had 4,953 Catholics and 2,908 Protestants. The Catholics did not have a parish church of their own in this parish, but belonged to the Catholic St. Nicholas parish, but they did, from 1729, have six schools here, all run by women.

After the collapse of the weaving trade and the economic slump after the Act of Union, most of the parishioners were left destitute. So proverbial was this parish for its poverty, that in the 19th century the advertisement of the annual charity sermon for St. Luke's was headed by the words, "The Poorest Parish in Dublin."

A school was established for poor boys of the parish in 1810. When the school was moved to New Street in 1862, the building was converted to form the Widows Alms House, which is still standing.

See also 
 Weavers' Hall, Dublin

References and sources
Notes

Sources

George Newenham Wright An Historical Guide to the City of Dublin

Former churches in the Republic of Ireland
Church of Ireland churches in Dublin (city)